Sam Hickey (born 5 January 2000) is a Scottish boxer.

Career 
Hickey participated at the 2022 European Amateur Boxing Championships, being awarded the bronze medal in the middleweight event. In the middleweight event, it was that Lewis Richardson won against Hickey for which the score was a 4-1. This result made Hickey the first Scot to win a senior European medal for 16 years.

Hickey competed at the 2022 Commonwealth Games in Birmingham where he won gold in the Men's Middleweight matches beating Callum Peters of Australia in the final, making him the first Scot to be a men's middleweight champion and the first boxer from Dundee to win gold at a Commonwealth Games since Dick McTaggart in the 1958 games in Cardiff.

Achievements

Personal life 
Hickey was born in Dundee and grew up in the west end. He was member of the Lochee Boxing Club but now trains in Sheffield for GB.

References

External links 

2000 births
Living people
People from Dundee
Sportspeople from Dundee
People from Lochee
Scottish male boxers
Middleweight boxers
Boxers at the 2022 Commonwealth Games
Commonwealth Games gold medallists for Scotland
Commonwealth Games medallists in boxing
21st-century Scottish people
Medallists at the 2022 Commonwealth Games